The Bidzhan is a river in the Jewish Autonomous Oblast, Russia. Bidzhan comes from the Tungusic word "Bidzen", meaning "Permanent settlement"). Bidzhan is formed by the confluence of the source rivers Pravyy Bidzhan and Levyy Bidzhan in the Lesser Khingan and runs from there from north to south and ends up flowing along the larger river Amur. Along the river is the town of Birobidzhan, which is the administrative center of the Jewish Autonomous Oblast and is partly named after the river.

See also
List of rivers of Russia

References

Rivers of Jewish Autonomous Oblast